Istanbul Modern, a.k.a. Istanbul Museum of Modern Art,  is a contemporary art museum in the Beyoğlu district of Istanbul, Turkey, located inside the Galataport complex. Inaugurated on December 11, 2004, the museum focuses on artists from Turkey. As of 2012, Levent Çalıkoğlu is Director General, and Oya Eczacıbaşı serves as the Chair of the Board of Directors.

About 

Istanbul Modern was founded in 2004 as Turkey’s first museum of modern and contemporary art. Committed to sharing Turkey’s artistic creativity and cultural identity with the local and international art worlds, the museum hosts a broad array of interdisciplinary activities.

Embracing a global vision, Istanbul Modern collects works of modern and contemporary art, photography, design, architecture, and new media. Acting as an intermediary in the sharing of Turkey’s cultural identity with the international art environment, the museum supports artists in their production and efforts to form partnerships abroad.

Aspiring to make art accessible to the general public, Istanbul Modern provides educational programs to art enthusiasts of all ages. Through its collections, exhibitions, and educational programs, the museum aims to instill a love of the arts in all visitors and encourage their active participation in the arts.

New Museum Building

Istanbul Modern's new building, under construction at the museum's original location in Karaköy, is designed by Pritzker prize-winning architect Renzo Piano. During the construction works the collection was temporarily relocated to the former Union Française building in Beyoğlu, designed in 1896 by Alexander Vallaury.

Istanbul Modern’s new building will offer visitors various exhibition halls and all the conveniences and activities of the world's leading museums, including educational workshops, a cinema, library, design shop, event spaces, and a café and restaurant.

The temporary location in Beyoğlu was closed in 2022 in anticipation of the new Renzo Piano designed building's immenent opening. However as of March 2023 this building has not yet opened either.

See also
 Istanbul Biennial

References

External links

 
Many pictures from the museum reproduced

Art museums and galleries in Istanbul
Modern art museums
Contemporary art galleries in Turkey
Art museums established in 2004
Beyoğlu
2004 establishments in Turkey